Roger Jouet (15 September 1944 – 25 August 2022) was a French writer and historian.

References

1944 births
2022 deaths
20th-century French historians
21st-century French historians
Academic staff of the University of Caen Normandy
People from Manche
Mayors of places in Normandy
Members of the Regional Council of Normandy